The comprehensive discography of Skindred, a British rock band: To date, they have released seven studio albums, eleven singles, and thirteen music videos. This list does not include material performed by members of Skindred that was recorded with Dub War or Raw Bud.

Studio albums

Singles

Music videos

Other releases

References

Reggae discographies
Rock music group discographies
Discographies of British artists
Discography